Blastodacna mironovi is a moth in the family Elachistidae. It is found in Kyrgyzstan.

References

Moths described in 1989
Blastodacna
Moths of Asia